"The Frog and the Pussycat" is the third and final episode of the Rock & Chips trilogy. It was first screened on 28 April 2011, six days after the death of writer John Sullivan.

Plot
Picking up some time after "Five Gold Rings" in February 1962, as Del Boy and his friends (Boycie, Trigger, Jumbo, Albie, and Denzil) are having a smoke outside Sir Walter Raleigh Tower, his mother Joan reads her baby son, Rodney, a bedtime story, and regretfully talks about how Del ruined their future happiness. The door suddenly slams and Joan jumps.

Going back seven months earlier to July 1961, life is still more or less the same for the Trotter family. Del continues to pursue countless girls with his glass rings, Reg is still unemployed, and Joan works for Freddie "The Frog" Robdal as his "charlady", although they really use their time together for sexual pleasure (unknown to the rest of the Trotters, Robdal is the father of Rodney). Robdal, for his part, keeps his own eyes on the Trotter family, going as far as to assault Joan's lecherous employer, Mr. Raynor, by breaking his fingers and threatening him into silence after learning of his perverted behaviour towards her through gossip in the Nag's Head.

Del crosses paths with an old flame of his, Barbara Bird, and they go for a coffee together, where they agree to continue seeing each other but only after Barbara returns from an upcoming trip. Around the same time, Robdal gives Joan a ring as a gift, which she notices is from Margate. She asks Robdal if he stole this ring from the jewellery store in Margate while on the 1960 Jolly Boys' Outing with Del, but he denies it. Robdal and his friend, Gerald "Jelly" Kelly, are approached once again by the corrupt DI Thomas and DC Stanton, who now claim to have a one-eyed war hero eyewitness, Eric Poulton, to the Margate robbery, and later on, Thomas arrests them both when Poulton goes missing. However, Robdal comes triumphant once again when it is revealed that Poulton is actually a policeman who lost his eye in a street fight and served as the desk sergeant when DI Thomas first started as a policeman. It turns out Poulton was living in Margate opposite the jewellers, and Thomas asked him to tell a few "white lies" in return for a share of the reward money, but Robdal and Kelly paid him a visit and told him their side of the story, treating him to a holiday in Spain. All but defeated, Thomas begrudgingly drops the case, but once Kelly is gone, Thomas plays his trump card: he has acquired the ring which Robdal gave to Joan, which she recently pawned in order to buy Del a lambretta. Despite furiously threatening Joan over the phone, Robdal chooses to protect Joan and Del (and get Thomas off his back once and for all). Robdal subsequently takes the full blame and is imprisoned on an alternate charge for a few months while Kelly goes free.

Del, meanwhile, begins his own plans to make a film, "Dracula on the Moon", and become a millionaire. Joan, under the name "Reenie Turpin" (Trigger's aunt and Joan's best friend), visits Robdal in prison. Robdal claims that once he is released, he wants to move to his country house near Bournemouth and start a new life, and implores Joan to run away with Rodney to live with him. Joan accepts, but tells Robdal seven months later in February 1962 that she will only leave with him once she is certain of Del's financial security, even though Robdal, knowing of Del's life as a market trader, believes Del is old and smart enough to look after himself. During the conversation, Joan mentions that she briefly began working as a charlady for an art dealer, Roland Pernell, for seven pounds a week, although Pernell callously deducted three pounds from her salary for "tax reasons". This, as well as the mention of Pernell's name, pique Robdal's interest.

To get Del set up financially, she pushes his relationship with Barbara, who comes from a rich family. Del takes Barbara out to dinner, where he gets engaged with her. Barbara's parents, Bernard and Beryl, take a liking to Del and invite his family over for an engagement party, during which Reg gets drunk and makes a fool of himself. Unfortunately, whilst alone in the kitchen, Beryl makes a sexual pass at a surprised Del and is seen by the rest of the family. Beryl confesses that she never had the happy, privileged life Barbara had, and became so jealous, especially with her disturbed childhood and unhappy marriage to Bernard, that she began secretly dressing in Barbara's clothes and listening to her music while alone. Despite Joan's efforts to patch things up, the engagement is off, and Joan ultimately decides to remain in Peckham for Del's sake. Meanwhile, Robdal and Kelly rob Pernell's art gallery together: many years back, Pernell cheated Robdal out of some money and went into hiding. Once Robdal went to jail, Pernell re-emerged, opened a new art gallery, and cheated Joan out of almost half of her wages. By robbing Pernell, Robdal will make him a target for the Inland Revenue for tax fraud. Following this, Robdal vows to go straight, unaware of Del's failed relationship.

Returning to the opening scene, while Del and his friends share a smoke outside, Joan reads Rodney a bedtime story and laments how both her and Del's happy futures were ruined. The door slams and Reg comes inside, surprisingly calm and expressing relief that Del's relationship with Barbara is over, having been disturbed by Beryl's actions. Reg goes to bed, leaving Joan to sit with Rodney and wait for Robdal to call (unaware that he himself is waiting for Joan to call him). Del and his friends, meanwhile, steal some lambrettas and ride off into the night towards Brighton as Will You Love Me Tomorrow by The Shirelles plays in the background.

Connections to Only Fools and Horses
 Del's love for the song "Old Shep" is first displayed in this episode. It was first elaborated on in "Diamonds Are for Heather".
 Del's first use of one of his catchphrases, "Lovely Jubbly".
 The first signs of Del's affection for Rodney are shown in this episode, which foreshadows his bringing Rodney up in the future. He also calls him "Rodders" for the first time, which is his nickname in Only Fools and Horses.
 The first mention of Grandad's affair with Trigger's grandmother Alice, which explains the strain on Grandad's relationship with his wife Violet. It served as a major plot device for "Ashes to Ashes".
 The very first mention, both chronologically and production-wise, of Trigger's real name, "Colin Ball", although it is when Violet mentions his grandmother, Alice Ball. Trigger's name is not revealed at all in Only Fools and Horses.
 Violet casually mentions that she used to work as a charlady for an art dealer. This was first mentioned in "Yesterday Never Comes", where it is revealed that Violet actually stole one of the dealer's paintings and kept it in Del's flat until an opportunist, Miranda Davenport, sways it away from Del, unaware that it is stolen.
 Although it is only hinted in "Five Gold Rings", DI Thomas is revealed here to be deeply immoral and corrupt despite his cheery and warm exterior, making him very similar to DCI Roy Slater. The main difference is that Thomas's goal is to expose the truth, by putting Robdal behind bars since he knows of his guilt, while Slater engages in bribery, blackmail and framing in order to get results, whether they are true or not.
 DC Stanton demands to be called "DC Stanton", "Mr. Stanton", or "Sir". The same is uttered later by Roy Slater in "May The Force Be With You".
 Robdal hints more than once that he may be DC Stanton's father. This is similar to what happens with Rodney in "The Frog's Legacy", until it is finally confirmed that Robdal is indeed Rodney's true father in "Sleepless in Peckham".
 Robdal robs an art gallery at the end of the special. It is possible that these paintings were among those found in his home as explained in "The Frog's Legacy".
 Robdal expresses obvious disdain at Rodney's middle name being "Charlton". This is first seen in "Little Problems", where Rodney is visibly embarrassed about his middle name.
 Joan's decision to remain in Peckham with Del rather than flee to Bournemouth with Robdal demonstrates how much she loves her son. Throughout Only Fools and Horses, Del repeatedly references Joan, whom he appeared to love more than anyone in his life.
 Robdal openly believes Del can look after himself if Joan and Rodney run away with him to Bournemouth. This was almost the exact scenario in the canon storyline when Robdal was killed in an explosion, Joan died of an illness, and Reg left Nelson Mandela House a few months later, although Del would not only look after himself, but also ironically be the one to bring up Rodney, Robdal and Joan's son.
 Del's idea to make a film, called "Dracula on the Moon" could be a reference to "Video Nasty", where he comes up with an equally bad idea for a film called "There's a Rhino Loose in the City".

Cast
Nicholas Lyndhurst as Frederick "Freddie the Frog" Robal
James Buckley as Derek "Del Boy" Trotter
Kellie Bright as Joan Trotter
Shaun Dingwall as Reg Trotter
Phil Daniels as Grandad/Edward "Ted" Trotter
Paula Wilcox as Violet "Vi" Trotter
Paul Putner as Gerald "Jelly" Kelly
Mel Smith as DI Thomas
Tom Brooke as DC Martin Stanton
Stephen Lloyd as Boycie
Ashley Jerlach as Denzil
Lewis Osborne as Trigger
Lee Long as Jumbo Mills
Jonathan Readwin as Albie Littlewood
Emma Cooke as Reenie Turpin
Jessica Ashworth as Barbara Bird
Samantha Spiro as Beryl Bird
Alex MacQueen as Bernard Bird
Robert Daws as Ernie Raynor
Dave Lamb as Sergeant Foster

External links

"The Frog and the Pussycat" at the British Comedy Guide

2011 British television episodes